Afroeurydemus hopei is a species of leaf beetle of the Republic of the Congo and the Democratic Republic of the Congo, described by Gilbert Ernest Bryant in 1938.

References 

Eumolpinae
Beetles of Africa
Insects of the Republic of the Congo
Beetles of the Democratic Republic of the Congo
Beetles described in 1938